Qualifying Heat is the 14th album by Thelma Houston. While the album failed to crossover into the Pop market, the album became a success in both the Urban and Club/Dance music markets charting on Billboard for 6 months. Includes the hits "You Used To Hold Me So Tight", "(I Guess) It Must Be Love" and "I'd Rather Spend The Bad Times With You Than The Good Times With Someone New". On August 20, 2007, this album was reissued as an import title including a bonus track titled, "Standing In The Light" (from her 1983 album).

Track listing
 "(I Guess) It Must Be Love" (Monte Moir)
 "You Used To Hold Me So Tight" (Jimmy Jam & Terry Lewis)
 "Fantasy and Heartbreak" (Monte Moir)
 "I'd Rather Spend the Bad Times With You Than Spend The Good Times With Someone New" (Jimmy Jam & Terry Lewis)
 "Shake You" (Clif Magness, Glen Ballard)
"Generate Love" (Dennis Lambert)
 "Love Is a Dangerous Game" (Dennis Lambert)
 "What a Woman Feels Inside" (Derek Nakamoto, Romeo Blue)
 "Standing in the Light" (Bonus track) (Jai Winding, John Arias)

1984 albums
Thelma Houston albums
Albums produced by Jimmy Jam and Terry Lewis
Albums produced by Glen Ballard
MCA Records albums